Lotus Bakeries is a Belgian biscuit company, founded in 1932, with its headquarters in Lembeke, Kaprijke, Belgium. Lotus is known for its speculoos biscuits and biscuit-based products, branded as Lotus Biscoff in the United States, United Kingdom, Australia, Brazil, Germany and India. The company has become an international group. Brands include Lotus, Lotus Biscoff, Dinosaurus, Peijnenburg, Annas, Nākd, TREK, BEAR and Kiddylicious.

Products 

 Speculoos / Biscoff caramelized biscuits
 Speculoos  / Biscoff cookie butter spread (available in smooth and crunchy textures, similar to nut butter variants)
 Lotus Krispy Kreme doughnut varieties

History
The company Lotus was founded in Lembeke in 1932 by the brothers Jan, Emiel and Henri Boone. When the company was founded, the brothers made cookies for breakfast and also speculoos for St Nicholas' Day; they later specialised in speculoos. Karel Boone, the son of founder Jan Boone, became a director in 1966 and was the CEO of Lotus for 32 years from 1974, and then the president of the company for 20 years (1966–2012). In the mid-1980s, Delta became the first airline to serve Biscoff in-flight, a move that their full-service competitors, American and United, have mimicked to great success.
In 2006, his brother Matthieu took over as CEO. At the end of 2011, a new generation took over with Jan Boone becoming the new CEO of the company. 

In 2012, Lotus took over the Dinosaurus brand, starting production in mid-2013. In 2015, Lotus started producing the Trek, Nākd, BEAR and Kiddylicious brands.

In 2019, Lotus Bakeries opened up two new factories on two different continents:
 The BEAR factory in Wolseley, South Africa, taking control of the production of the BEAR fruit snacks.

 Production facility for Lotus Biscoff in Mebane in the state of North Carolina in the United States which marks the first production of Lotus Biscoff outside of Belgium.

References

External links

Bakeries of Belgium
Companies based in East Flanders
Food and drink companies established in 1932
Companies listed on Euronext Brussels
Belgian companies established in 1932
Biscuit brands